Étienne Jourde (15 August 1891 – 20 October 1921) was a French international football player. He played as an attacker and played for CASG Paris and CA Vitry. Jourde was also a French international and is one of six players to captain the team on his debut, which he did on 3 April 1910 in a 4–0 defeat to Belgium. He scored his only goal for the team on 25 January 1914 in a 4–3 win against Belgium.

References

External links
 
 
 

1891 births
1921 deaths
French footballers
France international footballers
Association football forwards